The Worldwide Universities Network (WUN) is a non-profit consortium of 24 research-intensive universities founded in 2000. It provides financial and infrastructural support to member universities to support international research collaboration and academic mobility.

Members
, the member institutions are:
 University of Alberta
 University of Auckland
 University of Bergen
 University of Bristol
 University of Cape Town
 Chinese University of Hong Kong
 University College Dublin
 University of Ghana
 University of Lausanne
 University of Leeds
 Maastricht University
 Mahidol University
 Makerere University
 National Cheng Kung University
 University of Pretoria
 Renmin University of China
 University of Rochester
 Ruhr University Bochum
 University of Sheffield
 University of Southampton
 Tecnológico de Monterrey
 Universidade Federal de Minas Gerais
 University of Technology Sydney
 University of York

The network is funded principally by its member universities, which each pay an annual subscription fee.

Structure
WUN is managed by a secretariat that is responsible for the operations, communications, and strategy implementation of the network.

Partnership Board 
The Partnership Board comprises the Presidents, Vice-Chancellors or Rectors of the member universities and the WUN Executive Director.

 Chair: Professor Sandra Almeida, Rector, Universidade Federal de Minas Gerais
 Vice-Chair: Professor Dawn Freshwater, Vice-Chancellor, The University of Auckland 

Board members
Professor Bill Flanagan, President and Vice-Chancellor, University of Alberta
Professor Margareth Hagen, Rector, University of Bergen
Professor Hugh Brady, Vice-Chancellor, University of Bristol
Professor Mamokgethi Phakeng, Vice-Chancellor, University of Cape Town
Professor Andrew Deeks, President, University College Dublin
Professor Nana Aba Amfo, Vice-Chancellor, University of Ghana
Professor Rocky Tuan, Vice-Chancellor, The Chinese University of Hong Kong
Professor Frédéric Herman, Rector, University of Lausanne
Professor Simone Buitendijk, Vice-Chancellor, University of Leeds
Professor Rianne Letschert, President, Maastricht University
Professor Banchong Mahaisavariya, President, Mahidol University
Professor Barnabas Nawangwe, Vice-Chancellor, Makerere University
Professor Huey-Jen Jenny Su, President, National Cheng Kung University
Professor Tawana Kupe, Vice-Chancellor and Principal, University of Pretoria
Professor Liu Wei, President, Renmin University of China
Professor Sarah Mangelsdorf, President, University of Rochester
Professor Dr Martin Paul, Rector, Ruhr University Bochum 
Professor Koen Lamberts, Vice-Chancellor, The University of Sheffield
Professor Mark E. Smith, President and Vice-Chancellor, University of Southampton
Professor Andrew Parfitt, Vice-Chancellor and President, University of Technology Sydney
Dr David Garza, Rector, Tecnológico de Monterrey
Professor Charlie Jeffery, Vice-Chancellor and President, University of York
Professor Peter Lennie, WUN Executive Director

References

External links
 

International college and university associations and consortia
Organisations based in Leeds
University of Leeds
College and university associations and consortia in the United Kingdom
Educational organisations based in England